Copestylum vesicularium, the irridescent bromeliad fly, is a species of syrphid fly in the family Syrphidae. This species is widely distributed on the eastern half of North America.

References

External links

 

Eristalinae
Diptera of North America
Hoverflies of North America
Articles created by Qbugbot
Insects described in 1947
Taxa named by Charles Howard Curran